The 1983 FIA European Formula 3 Championship was the ninth edition of the FIA European Formula 3 Championship. The championship consisted of 16 rounds across the continent. The season was won by Italian Pierluigi Martini, with John Nielsen second and Emanuele Pirro in third.

Calendar

Results

Championship standings

Drivers' championship

References

External links 

1983 in motorsport
FIA European Formula 3 Championship